ISI or Isi may refer to:

Organizations
 Intercollegiate Studies Institute, a classical conservative organization focusing on college students
 Ice Skating Institute, a trade association for ice rinks
 Indian Standards Institute, former name of the national standards body of India, the Bureau of Indian Standards
 ISI mark, a product certification mark in India
 Institute for Scientific Information, part of Clarivate Analytics (formerly the Healthcare & Science business of the Thomson Reuters Corporation)
 Institute for Scientific Interchange, a theoretical scientific research centre based in Turin, Italy
 Inter-Services Intelligence, an intelligence agency of Pakistan
 International Statistical Institute, a professional association of statisticians
 International Systems Institute, a scientific and educational corporation founded by Béla H. Bánáthy
 Iron and Steel Institute, precedent organization to the Institute of Materials, Minerals and Mining
 Islamic State of Iraq, an umbrella organization of a number of Iraqi insurgency groups
 Integral Satcom Initiative, the European Technology Platform on Satellite Communications
 Independent  Schools Inspectorate, responsible for the inspection of independent schools and private further education colleges in England
 Integrated Systems, Inc., a former developer of real-time operating systems
 Image Space Incorporated, an independent video game developer
 ImageSat International, an Israeli satellite imagery company

Schools and educational institutions
 Indian Statistical Institute, a public research institute and university in Baranagar, Kolkata, India
 Indonesian Institute of the Arts, a collective name of arts university in Indonesia:
 Indonesian Institute of the Arts, Denpasar
 Indonesian Institute of the Arts, Surakarta
 Indonesian Institute of the Arts, Yogyakarta
 Information Sciences Institute, a research and development unit of the University of Southern California's Viterbi School of Engineering
 Institute of Scientific Instrumentation, a subsidiary of the Bangladesh University Grants Commission
 Intercollegiate Studies Institute, a non-profit educational organization
 International School Ibadan, a school located on the Campus of the University of Ibadan
 International School of Iceland, a school located in Garðabær, Iceland, a suburb of the capital city of Reykjavík
 Islamic School of Irving, in the Dallas-Fort Worth area

Science and technology
 Information Sharing Index, former name of ContactPoint, a government database that held information on all children in England
 Infrared Spatial Interferometer, an astronomical interferometer array of three telescopes
 Interstimulus interval, the temporal interval between the offset of one stimulus to the onset of another
 Intersymbol interference, a form of distortion of a signal in which one symbol interferes with subsequent symbols
 Instruction Storage Interrupt, Segmentation fault of a PowerPC

Other uses
 Isi (name), personal name, sometimes an abbreviation of various other names
 "Isi" (song), 1975 track by Neu! from the album Neu! '75
 İsi, a village and municipality in Azerbaijan
 Import substitution industrialization, a trade and economic policy

See also
 Isis (disambiguation)
 IS1 (disambiguation)